Uzoma Asagwara  is a Canadian politician and retired basketball player. Since 2019, they have represented the Union Station electoral district in the Legislative Assembly of Manitoba. Asagwara is a member of the Manitoba New Democratic Party (Manitoba NDP).

Biography 
Asagwara was born in Winnipeg to Igbo Nigerian parents. In 2008, Asagwara completed a Bachelor of Science in Psychiatric Nursing from the University of Winnipeg and Brandon University. Asagwara was the University of Winnipeg Female Athlete of the Year in 2005–06. In 2007 they led the Canadian Interuniversity Sport in scoring with 28.05 points per game. Asagwara was a member of the Canadian National Basketball Team for two years and was part of the team at the Pan American Games in 2007. Prior to their election, Asagwara worked full-time as a registered psychiatric nurse specializing in adult and youth mental health and addictions.

Asagwara has a long history as a grassroots community activist, educator, entrepreneur and mental health advocate. They have served as a member of the former Premier's Advisory Council on education, poverty, and citizenship, and as a member of the Women's Health Clinic board of directors.  In 2014, Asagwara founded Queer People of Colour Winnipeg, a Winnipeg-based initiative that creates safer spaces for and increases the visibility and representation of queer and transgender people of colour.

Legislative Assembly of Manitoba 
In the 2019 Manitoba general election, Asagwara was elected to represent the Union Station electoral district.  Asagwara, alongside Jamie Moses and Audrey Gordon, is one of the first three Black Canadian MLAs elected in Manitoba. They are also the first queer black person to win a seat and Manitoba's first gender non-conforming MLA.

Asagwara currently serves as the Manitoba NDP's health critic. During their time in the legislature, Asagwara has advocated for recognition of Manitoba's minority communities, and was able to pass a bill marking Somali Heritage Week. In November 2021, Asagwara has been re-nominated to represent the NDP in the Union Station riding.

Electoral record

References

New Democratic Party of Manitoba MLAs
Black Canadian politicians
Living people
21st-century Canadian politicians
Basketball players from Winnipeg
Politicians from Winnipeg
Canadian LGBT people in provincial and territorial legislatures
Canadian people of Igbo descent
Canadian people of Nigerian descent
Canadian sportsperson-politicians
Black Canadian LGBT people
Non-binary politicians
Non-binary sportspeople
1984 births
21st-century Canadian LGBT people